Princess Anni-Frid Reuss, Dowager Countess of Plauen (Anni-Frid Synni Lyngstad; born 15 November 1945), widely known as Anni-Frid Lyngstad and also known by her nickname "Frida", is a Swedish singer, songwriter and environmentalist, who is best known as one of the founding members and lead singers of the Swedish pop band ABBA. Born in Bjørkåsen (Ballangen), Norway, to a Norwegian mother and a German father, she grew up in Torshälla, Sweden, and started her first solo career there, as a jazz singer in 1967, through a talent competition called New Faces.

She won the competition with her song, "En ledig dag", leading to a television appearance on Hylands Hörna on Dagen H; as a result, she was signed by EMI, and in turn was signed by Stig Anderson's record label, Polar Music, after years of releasing several singles and an album, Frida under the earlier record label. Although she had moderate success in Sweden, as she was a contestant for Melodifestivalen 1969 with her song "Härlig är vår jord", she did not reach international fame until she joined ABBA, which has sold over 150 million albums and singles worldwide, making them one of the best-selling music acts in history. 

After the break-up of ABBA, she continued an international solo singing career with mixed success, releasing the albums Something's Going On (1982) and Shine (1984); the latter being her last international album. In 1996, Lyngstad recorded her final album in Swedish, Djupa andetag (Deep Breaths), released by Anderson Records, before retiring from music.

In April 1964, Anni-Frid married Ragnar Fredriksson, with whom she had two children; they divorced in 1970. The following year she was engaged to Swedish pianist Benny Andersson, also a member of ABBA, until they married in 1978. The couple separated in 1980 and divorced in 1981. In 1992, Lyngstad married Prince Heinrich Ruzzo Reuss, Count of Plauen, who was a prince of the former sovereign House of Reuss; since then she has held the titles of Princess Reuss and Countess of Plauen with the style of Her Serene Highness. Heinrich Ruzzo died of lymphoma in October 1999, leaving her the titles of Dowager Princess and Countess. She currently resides in Genolier VD, Switzerland, sharing a home with her British partner, Henry Smith, 5th Viscount Hambleden.

Early life
Anni-Frid Synni Lyngstad was born 15 November 1945 in Bjørkåsen, a small village in Ballangen near Narvik, in northern Norway, to a Norwegian mother, Synni Lyngstad (19 June 1926 – 28 September 1947), and a German father, Alfred Haase (29 June 1919 – 23 February 2009), who was a sergeant in the Wehrmacht, not long after the end of the Second World War and the German occupation of Norway. Haase had returned to Germany when his unit was evacuated. 

In early 1947, Anni-Frid, her mother Synni, and her maternal grandmother, Arntine "Anni" Lyngstad, left their birthplace in Norway, fearing reprisals against those who had dealings with the Germans during the occupation. Anni-Frid was taken by her grandmother to Sweden, where they settled in the region of Härjedalen. Her grandmother took any available job while living there, whereas Synni remained in Norway and worked for a time in the south of the country. Synni joined her mother and daughter in Sweden, and the three moved to Malmköping (72 km from Stockholm). Synni died of kidney failure soon afterwards, aged 21 years, leaving Anni-Frid to be raised solely by her grandmother.

In June 1949, they both relocated to Torshälla, outside Eskilstuna, where Anni worked as a seamstress. Anni-Frid grew up in Torshälla and began to attend school in August 1952. During her childhood, Anni-Frid had close contact with her family, particularly her uncle and four aunts, at her birthplace during the summer holidays. She was close to her aunt, Olive, who once stated that she saw how lonely and subdued Anni-Frid was, and, consequently, always did her best to make Anni-Frid feel loved and welcomed, during her visits.

According to Lyngstad, her father, Alfred Haase, had died while returning to Germany from the war, as his ship was reported to have been sunk. However, in 1977, the German teen magazine Bravo published a poster and a complete biography with details of Lyngstad's background, including the names of her mother and father. It was seen by Lyngstad's half-brother, Peter Haase, who went to his father and asked him if he had been in Ballangen during the war. A few months later, Lyngstad met Haase in Stockholm for the first time.

Career

1958–1969: Early work
Lyngstad stated in several interviews that her grandmother frequently sang songs to her (such as old Norwegian songs), which resulted in her love for music. She showed musical talent at a very early age from her earliest school years. On Fridays, she was often asked by her teacher to sing in front of the class and soon became known in school and in the neighbourhood for her beautiful voice. Although her grandmother encouraged her to sing (according to Lyngstad herself), she never attended any of her performances. Her grandmother died shortly before ABBA formed and therefore never witnessed the success of the group.

At the age of 13, Lyngstad gained her first job as a dance band and schlager singer in 1958, with the Evald Ek's Orchestra. Evald Ek himself remembers: "It was hard to believe, such a young person could sing that well. She was so easy to rehearse with and she was never shy onstage. The only thing I taught her was to sing out. In those days, she had a tendency of holding back her voice a little." With the Evald Eks Orchestra, the 13-year-old Lyngstad, performed every weekend in front of a dancing audience. The sets often lasted up to five hours. The songs she liked most to sing were the evergreens; "All of Me", "Night and Day" and "Begin the Beguine". To advance and develop, she also started to take singing lessons with opera tenor, Folke Andersson. Later, she teamed up with a 15-piece 'Bengt Sandlunds Bigband', who performed a jazz repertoire covering Glenn Miller, Duke Ellington and Count Basie; her vocal idols being Ella Fitzgerald and Peggy Lee. In 1963, she was the vocalist with the 'Gunnar Sandevarn Trio' before forming her own band, the Anni-Frid Four. These groups all contained her husband, Ragnar Fredriksson.

On 3 September 1967, Lyngstad won the Swedish national talent competition, "New Faces", arranged by record company EMI Svenska, and held at Skansen, Stockholm. The song she chose to sing was "En Ledig Dag" ("A Day Off", original title: "Week-End in Portofino"). The first prize in this contest was a recording contract with EMI's Swedish subsidiary. Unbeknownst to Lyngstad, the winner of the contest was also expected to appear the same evening in the country's most popular TV show at that time, Hylands Hörna. This happened on the same day Sweden switched from driving on the left-hand side of the road to the right-hand side. Driving on that day was discouraged, so most of the nation was watching TV that night. Lyngstad performed her winning song live. The performance can be seen on Frida - The DVD.

This first exposure to a wider television audience caused a sensation, and many record companies and producers contacted Frida immediately. EMI executives, fearing they might lose their new singer, took the precaution of driving from Stockholm to Lyngstad's home in Eskilstuna the next morning with a recording contract for her to sign. EMI producer Olle Bergman remembers: "We got so interested and fond of her and I thought she had everything a person needs to become something."

On 11 September 1967, Lyngstad recorded the vocals for "En ledig dag", which was to become her first single for EMI Sweden, under the company's His Master's Voice label. Professional and self-assured on this first day in the studio, she recorded the vocals in just one take. The early songs she recorded for EMI are included in the compilation album, Frida 1967–1972, released by EMI Sweden in 1997.

On 29 January 1968, she performed this song on 'Studio 8' on national television and on this occasion briefly met future ABBA member Agnetha Fältskog, who also performed her first single on the same SVT1 programme. Lyngstad toured Sweden with Lasse Lönndahl and Bengt Hallberg in 1968, and recorded several singles for EMI. At the same time, she decided to leave her family and move to Stockholm to start working full-time as a singer.

In 1969, she participated in Melodifestivalen, the Swedish heats for the Eurovision Song Contest, with the song "Härlig är vår jord" ("Our Earth Is Wonderful"), and finished in fourth place. In the backstage she met her future second husband and ABBA bandmate Benny Andersson.

1970–1971: Pre-ABBA
Her first album, Frida, produced by her then-fiancé Benny Andersson, was released in 1971 by EMI Columbia. The album received generous praise from critics and the press, who especially commented on the precision and versatility of Lyngstad's voice. A reviewer for the Swedish newspaper Dagens Nyheter wrote: "Professional, sure and certain LP-debut ... low-key but self-assured personality with sprinkles of temperament, humor and tenderness. And she sings in such a way that you understand that she's got something between her ears – she sings, in other words, in a very intelligent way". That same year, she released her single "Min egen stad" ("My Own Town"), a cover version of Andersson's song "It's Nice To Be Back" with lyrics by Peter Himmelstrand; the single reached No. 1 in Svensktoppen. All four future members of ABBA sang back-up vocals on this song. The success of the single led EMI Columbia to re-issue the Frida album with "Min egen stad" added to the beginning of side two of the LP.  The entire album was included in the EMI Sweden compilation Frida 1967–1972.

Frida continued to play in cabarets, and tour and regularly perform on TV and radio. Subsequently, her relationship with Andersson, and friendship with Björn Ulvaeus and Agnetha Fältskog led to the formation of ABBA. In 1972, after five years with EMI Sweden, Lyngstad changed record companies and moved to the Polar Music label. She recorded the single "Man vill ju leva lite dessemellan" ("One wants to live a little from time to time"), which became her second No. 1 hit in the Swedish charts.

1972–1981: ABBA and Frida ensam

At first, Lyngstad was hesitant to perform with her boyfriend Benny Andersson, his best friend Björn Ulvaeus and his wife, Agnetha Fältskog. Their first project together in the winter of 1970–1971 was the cabaret act Festfolket, which was not a success. The following year, Lyngstad toured with Lasse Berghagen, while the other three future ABBA members started performing together on a regular basis. Eventually, she rejoined the ensemble. Andersson and Ulvaeus were busy producing other artists, but soon discovered the qualities of Lyngstad's and Fältskog's voices combined; thus, the band was formed initially as Björn & Benny, Agnetha & Anni-Frid, later renamed ABBA.

Possessing a wide mezzo-soprano vocal range, according to both Ulvaeus and herself, Lyngstad sang solo parts in the following ABBA songs: "Andante, Andante", "Bumblebee", "Cassandra", "Fernando", "Get On The Carousel", "Gonna Sing You My Lovesong", "I Am the City", "I Have a Dream", "I Let the Music Speak", "On Top of Old Smokey", "I Still Have Faith in You", "I Wonder (Departure)", "The King Has Lost His Crown", "Knowing Me, Knowing You", "Like an Angel Passing Through My Room", "Lovers (Live a Little Longer)", "Me and Bobby and Bobby's Brother", "Me and I", "Money, Money, Money", "The Name Of The Game", "No Doubt About It", "One Man, One Woman", "Our Last Summer", "Put On Your White Sombrero", "Should I Laugh or Cry", "Super Trouper", "Tropical Loveland",  "The Visitors", "The Way Old Friends Do" and "When All Is Said and Done".

Lyngstad clearly enjoyed the spotlight more than the other three members of ABBA. She liked to tour and to meet audience members one-to-one. She took an active part in co-designing the famed ABBA costumes for their tours and TV performances. Since the members of ABBA went their separate ways, Lyngstad has been the only one who openly regrets there has never been a reunion to date.

Her next solo album, in Swedish, was Frida ensam (Frida Alone), released in 1975 during the ABBA years, and produced by Andersson. This album includes her successful Swedish version of "Fernando", which stayed at the No. 1 spot in the Svensktoppen radio charts for 9 weeks, but was never released as a single. The album was recorded between sessions of the ABBA albums Waterloo and ABBA. Due to the activities of the group, the album took 18 months to record. Frida ensam became an enormous commercial and critical success in Sweden, topping the Swedish album charts for six weeks and remaining in the charts for 38. The album was mostly a collection of covers of songs by artists like the Beach Boys ("Skulle de' va' skönt"), 10cc ("Guld och gröna ängar") and David Bowie ("Liv på Mars?"), receiving positive reviews from Melody Maker: "The album portrays Frida as a very strong and emotive singer and shows the true value of the music, that if sung properly and with enough feeling it transcends all language barriers". This album was such a big success, it eventually went platinum.

1982–1984: International solo career

In 1982, during ABBA's last year as a working band, Frida recorded and released her first post-ABBA solo album. This was also her first solo album in English. The Phil Collins-produced album called Something's Going On became a big success for Frida worldwide. A much rockier sound was found on many of the songs and Phil Collins' drum sound had a major contribution, particularly on the lead single, "I Know There's Something Going On", which topped the charts in Belgium and Switzerland, and was a top 5 hit in Australia, Austria, France, Germany, the Netherlands, Norway, South Africa and Sweden amongst others. With the song and video being heavily promoted and played on MTV, the single also proved successful in the United States, reaching No. 13 on the Billboard Hot 100 (and No. 9 on Radio & Records) in March 1983, and was the 20th biggest selling single in the US that year. In the UK, the track was not a successful hit, only reaching No. 43.

The album itself received good reviews, with Billboard writing: "ABBA's auburn-haired songstress makes a bold solo project a stunning success", while Mark Coleman described the album in the third edition of Rolling Stone Album Guide as "a sharp, rock-oriented, delightfully eclectic album". William Cooper had a similar opinion in AllMusic: "Frida escapes the creative limitations of being a member of one of the world's most popular groups on this solid and often riveting album". Swedish Television SVT documented this historical event by filming the whole recording process. The result became a one-hour TV documentary, including interviews with Frida and Phil, Björn and Benny, as well as all the musicians involved with the album. Owing to the success of the album (selling 1.5 million copies worldwide), and its lead single, Frida was voted "Best Female Artist Of The Year" 1982, by the readers of Sweden's biggest evening paper Aftonbladet, receiving the Swedish Music Award Price Rockbjörnen.

In 1983, Lyngstad assisted with Abbacadabra, and recorded one of the tracks with two different male vocalists in different languages, including the French star Daniel Balavoine on the track "Belle" and on the English version "Time" with B. A. Robertson produced by Mike Batt. This track was a cover of "Arrival", an instrumental track from the ABBA album of the same name. She also jumps in and does the female recitation towards the end of the song Strip on the Strip album by Adam Ant who was recording the album at Polar Studios in Stockholm.

Lyngstad's next album was Shine (1984). This album was recorded at Studios De La Grande Armée in Paris, France and produced by Steve Lillywhite, known for his work with artists like Peter Gabriel, U2, the Rolling Stones, Morrissey and Kirsty MacColl amongst others. Lillywhite was only 29 when this album was recorded and he gave Frida a very experimental sound and managed to create a relaxed atmosphere in the studio. The album had much less success than hoped, though it reached the Top 20 in many European countries, No. 6 in Sweden being its highest position.

1985–2004: Later career
In 1987, Frida was in the choir for the recording of her former husband Benny Andersson's song "Klinga Mina Klockor". Also in 1987, Lyngstad recorded the single "Så Länge Vi Har Varann" ("As Long As We Have Each Other") with the Swedish pop group Ratata, one of Lyngstad's favourites. She was contacted by singer Mauro Scocco, who mentioned that he had a song suitable for a duet. After hearing it, Lyngstad accepted immediately. The song achieved great success in Sweden, and was also recorded in English under the title of "As long as I have you". An English-language video of the song was produced, although an Australian release of this song on Festival Records in January 1998 was eventually shelved.

In 1990, Lyngstad became a member of the committee of the Swedish environmental organization Det Naturliga Steget (The Natural Step). The organization wanted a "famous face" to help them reach the public, and in 1991 she became chairwoman for the organization Artister För Miljö (Artists For The Environment). In 1992, Lyngstad founded her Children and Environment Foundation which runs Summer Camps for underprivileged children.  Also in 1992, Lyngstad performed live at the Stockholm Water Festival at the Kings Castle and released the environmental charity single with her cover of Julian Lennon's song "Saltwater". All the royalties from this single went to charity. In 1993, on Queen Silvia's 50th birthday, Frida was asked to perform "Dancing Queen" on stage, as performed by ABBA when the king and queen married in 1976. Frida contacted The Real Group and together they performed the song at the Stockholm Opera House in front of the king and queen. The Swedish prime minister at the time, Ingvar Carlsson, also present that night, said it was an ingenious step to do "Dancing Queen" a cappella. This performance was filmed by Swedish TV and can be seen in Frida - The DVD.

In 1996, Lyngstad recorded her Swedish language album Djupa andetag (Deep Breaths). It was a long-awaited album as 12 years had passed since Shine was released. The album attracted overall relatively positive reviews and was a success in Sweden where it reached No. 1 on the album chart. Frida did many TV appearances in Sweden, Norway, Denmark and Finland to promote the album. Djupa andetag was one of the first Swedish albums to be released as a combined audio-video CD-ROM, including interviews with Lyngstad, footage from the making of the album, as well as promotional videos. Despite the fact that Djupa andetag was officially only released in Scandinavia and the songs were entirely sung in Swedish, a remix album of the single tracks "Även en blomma", "Alla Mina Bästa År" (a duet with Roxette's Marie Fredriksson) and "Ögonen" was released in Germany in 1998, entitled Frida - The Mixes. Despite the success of the album, none of these singles made a big impression on the Swedish charts. A one-hour documentary about the making of this album, both in the studio and from Frida's home in Mallorca, Spain, can be seen in Frida - The DVD. A follow-up album with producer Anders Glenmark was reportedly in the works, but was shelved due to the death of Frida's daughter in 1998. Lyngstad dedicated the song "Chemistry Tonight" (co-written by Kirsty MacColl) to the songwriter after MacColl's death in 2000.

A few low key and one-off recordings followed, including a 2002 duet with opera singer Filippa Giordano of the "Barcarolle" from Jacques Offenbach's Les contes d'Hoffman as well as the song "The Sun Will Shine Again", written by former Deep Purple member Jon Lord, and recorded in 2004. "Barcarolle" is only available on the Japanese edition of Giordano's album Rosso Amore and "The Sun Will Shine Again" can be found on Jon Lord's album Beyond The Notes (although a limited-promotional single had been made available). Lord and Lyngstad made several TV appearances in Germany performing the song, on shows like The Sunday Night Classics and The Golden Henne Gala. Lyngstad also joined Lord on stage singing the song during his European autumn tour in 2004. During this tour, she also performed "In the Bleak Midwinter", a performance of which can be found on social media.

For the 2004 semi-final of the Eurovision Song Contest, staged in Istanbul thirty years after ABBA had won the contest in Brighton, Lyngstad appeared in a special comedy video made for the interval act, entitled Our Last Video. All four members of the group appeared briefly in cameo roles, as did the singer Cher and British comedian Rik Mayall amongst others. The video was not included in the official DVD release of the Eurovision Contest, but was issued as a separate DVD release on the Universal Music label. It was billed as the first time the four had worked together since the group split in 1982 although they each filmed their appearances separately. Also in 2004, Lyngstad appeared with former bandmates Benny Andersson and Björn Ulvaeus in London at the fifth anniversary performance of Mamma Mia!, the musical based on ABBA songs. In 2008, she joined all three of her former ABBA colleagues at the Swedish premiere of Mamma Mia! at the arena Cirkus in Stockholm.

2005–present: Hiatus from music, selected public appearances and ABBA reunion

On 15 November 2005, to celebrate Lyngstad's 60th birthday, Universal Records released the box set Frida – 4xCD 1xDVD, consisting of all the solo albums she recorded for Polar Music and Anderson Records, including a set of bonus tracks. Also included was Frida – The DVD, a 3,5 hour documentary where Lyngstad talks about her entire career in the music business. Filmed in the Swiss Alps, she talks about her singing technique and about her career both before and after ABBA, and explains how songs were performed and recorded. In collaboration with Swedish TV, SVT, the film included many clips from her early television performances, such as her first TV performance with "En Ledig Dag", ("A Day Off"). Also included are TV documentaries about the making and recordings of Something's Going On and Djupa andetag (Deep Breaths).

In 2007, Lyngstad became one of the initial patrons of the Zermatt Unplugged Music Festival along with Jon Lord and Claude Nobs. 

In September 2010, a new album by musician Georg Wadenius titled Reconnection was released. Lyngstad and Wadenius had discussed working together for many years, as they had long been good friends. The album opens with her rendition of the traditional tune "Morning Has Broken", previously covered by Cat Stevens. This song is a favourite for Frida and the song was also on the playlist in the church for Frida and Prince Ruzzo's wedding on 26 August 1992.

On 16 February 2011, BBC Radio 4 broadcast a 45-minute play featuring Frida and the play's writer, long term fan and performer Christopher Green. The play, Like an Angel Passing Through My Room, was billed as "a story about love. The unconditional love of a devoted fan ... about a real and an imagined intimacy." It was a project several years in the making; what started as an upbeat reflection on fame and the notion of being a fan, developed into a meditation on the communication between two people and coping with the blows life deals. In an interview with Frida she and Green talked about her long recovery following the death of her husband in 1999. The play is reflective but with a comic sensibility. Frida stated in 2004 that she never intended to return to the music industry, although this was short-lived, and future studio albums were discussed in 2010.

In 2013, she helped organise the opening of ABBA The Museum in Stockholm stating she wanted to "let ABBA rest". The long-awaited ABBA reunion was expected to happen in 2014 to celebrate the 40th anniversary of the group's win at the Eurovision Song Contest. However, this did not happen. In 2015, Lyngstad, along with Dan Daniell, released the single "1865" about the Matterhorn in Switzerland.

On 19 August 2017, Lyngstad travelled to Torshälla to claim her award from the Eskilstuna Music Prize 2014.

In the summer of 2017, Lyngstad joined her ABBA bandmates Agnetha Faltskög, Björn Ulvaeus and Benny Andersson to record two new songs, "I Still Have Faith in You" and "Don't Shut Me Down". These songs were meant to be part of an ABBA-themed TV special that was eventually discarded and replaced by the more ambitious, digital-laden Voyage show. 

In 2018, Lyngstad and jazz trumpeter Arturo Sandoval released a duet of the ABBA song "Andante, Andante" as a single. The song is featured on Sandoval's album Ultimate Duets.

On 2 September 2021, via YouTube livestream, ABBA announced their upcoming virtual concert residency  "ABBA Voyage", as well as the imminent release of an eponymous album, recorded between 2017 and 2021. The new record, their first studio album in 40 years, features ten tracks, including "I Still Have Faith In You" and "Don't Shut Me Down", which also were first shown in the aforementioned livestream event and released as a double A-side single. On 5 November 2021, the Voyage album was released worldwide. On 27 May 2022, ABBA Voyage opened in a purpose-built venue named the ABBA Arena at the Queen Elizabeth Olympic Park in London.

Personal life

On 3 April 1964, 18-year-old Lyngstad married salesman and fellow musician Ragnar Fredriksson. They had two children: Hans Ragnar (born 26 January 1963) and Ann Lise-Lotte (25 February 1967 – 13 January 1998). They separated in 1968 and were officially divorced on 19 May 1970, the same day that her 71-year-old grandmother Arntine died.

In 1969, Lyngstad met Benny Andersson. By 1971, they were living together, but did not marry until 6 October 1978, during the height of ABBA's success. However, after only two years of marriage, they separated on 26 November 1980, and were divorced in 1981.

In 1982, Lyngstad left Sweden and moved to London. In 1986, she relocated to Switzerland, and lived with her boyfriend, landscape architect Prince Heinrich Ruzzo of Reuss, Count of Plauen (1950–1999), member of the ancient House of Reuss, in his family castle in Fribourg. The couple married on August 26, 1992, granting Lyngstad the title of Princess within Switzerland. Prince Heinrich Ruzzo died from lymphoma in 1999.

In 1988, Lyngstad became a grandmother when her daughter Ann Lise-Lotte and her American husband Charles Geritt Casper, welcomed their son Jonathan Casper.

Through her marriage to Prince Reuss of Plauen, who had been a student at the same boarding school as Crown Prince Carl Gustaf, who later became the King of Sweden, Lyngstad became acquainted with the Swedish royal family and eventually became close friends with Sweden's Queen Silvia.

On 13 January 1998, Lyngstad's 30-year-old daughter Ann Lise-Lotte Fredriksson Casper died of injuries sustained in a car accident in Livonia, New York, a town 20 miles south of Rochester.

Since 2007 she has been in a relationship with British peer Henry Smith, 5th Viscount Hambleden, with whom she resides in Genolier, Switzerland.

Other interests
According to Dagens Nyheter and Sveriges Radio, Lyngstad has supported the Swedish Moderate Party.  She appeared in a Swedish Employers Association advertisement, "Satsa på dig själv" (English: Invest in yourself), in 1979, which caused controversy and objections, especially from Mikael Wiehe, who rejected her offer to record a cover version of his song, Flickan och kråkan, due to political differences, in the 1980s.

Lyngstad is a vegetarian and a feminist. She remains involved in charity work. She is interested in environmental issues.

Awards and recognition
In 1964, Lyngstad won a national singing contest 'Flugan' (The Fly) and was awarded 'Vocalist Of The Year'.   In September 1967, Lyngstad won the 'Barnens Dag' contest held at Skansen, Stockholm. This led to her TV debut and a recording contract with EMI. In 1982, Lyngstad won the Swedish music prize Rockbjörnen for Best Female Artist She was inducted in the Rock and Roll Hall of Fame as a member of ABBA in 2010, and she represented the group in their acceptance speech, along with Benny Andersson. In 2014, she was awarded with the Eskilstuna Music Prize for her "pioneering career" and significant contribution to popular music as an "icon" who had "left an indelible imprint in musical history".

Title and style
Upon her marriage to Prince Heinrich in 1992, she took on a new name and became Princess Anni-Frid Synni of Reuss, Countess of Plauen, shortened to Anni-Frid Reuss. Since his death in 1999 Anni-Frid became the Dowager Princess and Countess, now called Princess Anni-Frid, Dowager Countess of Plauen. She is entitled to the style of Serene Highness.

Discography

 Swedish studio albums
 Frida (1971)
 Frida ensam (1975)
 Djupa andetag (1996)

English studio albums
 Something's Going On (1982)
 Shine (1984)

Filmography

See also
List of Swedes in music

Notes

References

Sources
 Carl Magnus Palm: ABBA – The Complete Recording Sessions, Century 22 Limited UK, 1994.

External links

Official ABBA website
Frida on Europopmusic.eu (English)
Mikory's Frida Pages Frida History translated to English

1945 births
Living people
People from Ballangen
People from Eskilstuna
Swedish people of German descent
Swedish people of Norwegian descent
Norwegian people of German descent
Norwegian emigrants to Sweden
Swedish expatriates in Switzerland
Norwegian expatriates in Switzerland
ABBA members
Anni-Frid
German countesses
Princesses by marriage
Swedish mezzo-sopranos
Swedish pop singers
Swedish jazz singers
Norwegian pop singers
Norwegian jazz singers
English-language singers from Sweden
EMI Records artists
Norwegian expatriates in the United Kingdom
Swedish expatriates in the United Kingdom
20th-century Swedish women singers